The 2020 Football Tasmania season is the seventh season of soccer under the restructured format in Tasmania. The men's competitions consisted of three major divisions across the State. 

All NPL and grassroots competitions were suspended for one month due to the impacts from the COVID-19 pandemic in Australia, effective 18 March to 14 April, and further extended. The NPL and other senior competitions commenced on 18 July.

Men's Competitions

2020 NPL Tasmania
The NPL Premier normally qualifies for the national NPL finals series, but the 2020 National Premier Leagues finals series was cancelled in July.

2020 Tasmanian Championships

2020 Northern Championship

2020 Southern Championship

Women's Competitions

2020 Women's Super League

The 2020 Women's Super League season is the fifth edition of the statewide Tasmanian women's soccer league.

Cup competitions

References

2020 in Australian soccer
Football Federation Tasmania seasons
Football Tasmania season, 2020